Svitlana Volodymyrivna Kryvoruchko (born 21 November 1975) is a Ukrainian journalist, CEO in BTB and Kyiv TV channels. Merited Journalist of Ukraine.

Biography

Early years. Education 

Svitlana Kryvoruchko was born November 21, 1975 in Poltava.

In 1998 graduated from the Institute of Journalism of the Taras Shevchenko National University of Kyiv. Candidate of philological sciences.

Career 

During 1995-1996 was editorial office chief of the newspaper «City»
During 1996-1998 was editor of program «Daily Chronicle» (Ukrainian Independent TV Corporation)
Since 1998 she has worked as a leading specialist of press service in Kyiv City State Administration. Since 2001 became head of the department.
During 2007-2010 she served as Director of information and broadcasting journalistic in Kyiv TV channel
On December 20, 2010 appointed CEO of Kyiv TV channel
On February 14, 2012 appointed CEO of "Bank television"

State awards 

Merited Journalist of Ukraine (since November 13, 2011)

References

External links 
Biography on Kyiv TV channel website

1975 births
Living people
Mass media people from Poltava
Taras Shevchenko National University of Kyiv alumni
Ukrainian women journalists
Ukrainian chief executives
Ukrainian television managers